The Australian Journal of Politics and History is a quarterly peer-reviewed academic journal that publishes articles about history, political studies, and international affairs, concentrating on Australia, the Asia-Pacific region, and modern Europe. It was established in 1955 and was published triannually until 1997. In 1998 it began publishing quarterly. Until recently it was edited by Andrew Bonnell and Matt McDonald and is now edited by Geoff Ginn and Lisa Featherstone. It is published by Wiley-Blackwell on behalf of the School of Political Science & International Studies and the School of Historical & Philosophical Inquiry at the University of Queensland.

Abstracting and indexing
It is indexed or abstracted in the following services:
Academic Search
Academic ASAP
Arts & Humanities Citation Index
Cambridge Scientific Abstracts
Current Contents/Arts & Humanities
International Bibliography of the Social Sciences
InfoTrac
ProQuest databases

References

External links

Publications established in 1955
History journals
English-language journals
Quarterly journals
Wiley-Blackwell academic journals
1955 establishments in Australia
University of Queensland academic journals